Little by Little: Collectors Edition is an EP by Robert Plant released in 1985.

Track listing

Side one
"Little by Little" (remix long version) (Robert Plant, Jezz Woodroffe) – 5:10
"Easily Lead" (Plant, Paul Martinez, Woodroffe) – 7:52

Side two
"Rockin' at Midnight" (Roy Brown) – 4:17
"Sixes and Sevens" (Plant, Martinez, Woodroffe, Richard Hayward) – 6:04

Side one, track two and side two, track one recorded live in Dallas, Texas on 24 June 1985.

Robert Plant EPs
1985 EPs